Ventsislav Dimitrov (born 27 March 1988) is a Bulgarian footballer, who plays as a goalkeeper for Pavlikeni.

Career
On 18 January 2017, Dimitrov joined Litex Lovech.

References

Bulgarian footballers
1988 births
Living people
FC Etar 1924 Veliko Tarnovo players
PFC Dobrudzha Dobrich players
SFC Etar Veliko Tarnovo players
PFC Akademik Svishtov players
FC Oborishte players
FC Lyubimets players
PFC Litex Lovech players
First Professional Football League (Bulgaria) players
Second Professional Football League (Bulgaria) players
Association football goalkeepers